Le Matin may refer to:

Newspapers

Current newspapers 
Le Matin (Switzerland), a Swiss daily newspaper
Le Matin (Senegal), a daily newspaper in Senegal
Le Matin (Haiti), a daily newspaper in Haiti
Le Matin (Morocco), a daily Moroccan newspaper

Former newspapers 
Le Matin (France), a French newspaper (1884–1944)
Le Matin de Paris, a French daily newspaper (1977–1988)

Le Matin (Acadian), a Canadian newspaper last published 1988

Music
"Le Matin", two compositions by Saint-Saëns
Symphony No. 6 (Haydn), popularly known as "Le Matin"

See also 

Matin (disambiguation)